Gjettum is a neighbourhood in Bærum, Akershus, Norway. It is located south of Kolsås. The area is named after the Gjettum farm. 

Gjettum is served by the Gjettum station on the Kolsås Line.

Mer stoff
Artikkelni Store Norske Leksikon

References

Neighbourhoods in Bærum